Alire is both a surname and a given name. Notable people with the name include:

Camila Alire, American librarian
Alire Raffeneau Delile (1778–1850), French botanist

Benjamin Alire Sáenz (born August 16, 1954) is an American poet, novelist and writer of children's books. https://en.wikipedia.org/wiki/Benjamin_Alire_S%C3%A1enz